Workin' Band is the eighteenth studio album by American country folk group Nitty Gritty Dirt Band, released in 1988. The album peaked at No. 33 on the US country albums chart. "Workin' Man (Nowhere to Go)" and "I've Been Lookin'" were released as singles, each reaching the top ten of the Billboard country singles chart. This was their first album to feature Bernie Leadon, who replaced founding member John McEuen, because he left for a solo career.

Track listing

Personnel
Jeff Hanna – vocals, acoustic and electric guitar
Jimmie Fadden – vocals, drums, harmonica, jaw harp, percussion
Jimmy Ibbotson – vocals, bass, guitars, mandolin, mandola, percussion
Bob Carpenter – vocals, piano, synthesizer, accordion, keyboard bass

Other players
Bernie Leadon – vocals, acoustic and electric guitar, 5-string banjo, mandolin, mandocello, slide guitar
Josh Leo – electric and acoustic guitar
Larry Paxton – electric bass
Mark O'Connor – fiddle

Production
Producer – Josh Leo

Chart performance

References
All information is from album liner noted unless otherwise noted. Writing credits from the LP label.

Nitty Gritty Dirt Band albums
1988 albums
Warner Records albums